Hu Denghui (1941–1969) was a Chinese footballer.

Club career
In 1962, Hu graduated from Beijing Sport University. Hu played youth football for both Beijing and Bayi before making the step-up to Bayi's senior team.

International career
In March 1965, Hu made his debut for China, playing against Guinea, Mali and Albania as part of a tour. On 28 June 1966, Hu scored a hat-trick in a 10–4 victory against Tanzania. Just under a month later, on 23 July 1966, Hu scored another hat-trick for China, this time in a 6–0 win over Syria.

Death
Starting in 1966, Hu began to be the victim of persecution as a result of the Cultural Revolution, being accused of being a "counterrevolutionary". During the same time, his father was imprisoned. In 1969, Hu hanged himself from a tree in Yuanmingyuan Park in Beijing. At the time of Hu's death, he only weighed 40kg.

References

1941 births
1969 suicides
Footballers from Beijing
Association football forwards
Beijing Sport University alumni
Chinese footballers
Beijing Guoan F.C. players
Bayi Football Team players
China international footballers
Suicides by hanging in China
Suicides during the Cultural Revolution